KBRA (95.9 FM) is a radio station licensed to Freer, Texas, United States. The station is currently owned by Cobra Broadcasting, LLC - KBRA.

History
The Federal Communications Commission issued a construction permit for the station on 1982-10-29. The station was assigned the call sign KAUA on 1983-01-04, and changed its call sign to KOBR on 1985-01-25. The station received its license to cover on 1985-03-18. On 1985-08-30, the station again changed its call sign to the current KBRA.

References

External links

BRA
Radio stations established in 1985
1985 establishments in Texas